Sarajuy-ye Jonubi Rural District is in Saraju District of Maragheh County, East Azerbaijan province, Iran. At the National Census of 2006, its population was 2,961 in 596 households. There were 3,224 inhabitants in 845 households at the following census of 2011. At the most recent census of 2016, the population of the rural district was 2,957 in 1,030 households. The largest of its 16 villages was Aghcheh Kohel, with 761 people.

References 

Maragheh County

Rural Districts of East Azerbaijan Province

Populated places in East Azerbaijan Province

Populated places in Maragheh County